The 2019 Lafayette Leopards football team represents Lafayette College in the 2019 NCAA Division I FCS football season. The Leopards are led by third-year head coach John Garrett and play their home games at Fisher Field. They are a member of the Patriot League.

Previous season
The Leopards finished the 2018 season 3–8, 2–4 in Patriot League play to finish in a three-way tie for fourth place.

Preseason

Preseason coaches' poll
The Patriot League released their preseason coaches' poll on July 30, 2019 (voting was by conference head coaches and sports information directors). The Leopards were picked to finish in sixth place.

Preseason All-Patriot League team
The Leopards had four players selected to the preseason All-Patriot League team.

Offense

Nick Pearson – WR

Jake Marotti – OL

Defense

Malik Hamm – DL

Yasir Thomas – DB

Schedule

Game summaries

at William & Mary

at Monmouth

Sacred Heart

at Albany

Penn

at Princeton

at Georgetown

Bucknell

Fordham

at Holy Cross

Colgate

at Lehigh

References

Lafayette
Lafayette Leopards football seasons
Lafayette Leopards football